Minerve was a Téméraire-class 74-gun ship of the line, later razeed and commissioned as a frigate. Started during the Empire, she was launched during the Bourbon Restoration, rebuilt during the reign of Louis-Philippe, and served as a gunnery school through the French Second Republic and the Second French Empire, only to be broken up shortly after the advent of the French Third Republic.

Career 
Ordered in 1807, the ship was initially to be named Couronne, but was renamed Glorieux in 1812, and Duc de Berry in 1814 at the Bourbon Restoration. She was eventually launched in 1818. In 1830 after the July Revolution she became Glorieux again. The next year, she was renamed Minerve and razeed to a frigate.

Launched for the second time in 1833, Minerve served a flagship of the naval station off Brazil. In 1841, she cruised off Madagascar before becoming the flagship of the Middle East naval station in 1844. On 10 October 1844, she ran aground off Rhodes, Greece; she was refloated with the aid of the French Navy brig  and six Ottoman Navy vessels.

From 1848, Minerve was used as a gunnery training ship. She was hulked in 1853 and eventually broken up in 1874.

Notes and references

Notes

References

Bibliography 
 Frégates à voiles de 1er rang , la Flotte de Napoléon III
 

Frigates of the French Navy
Ships built in France
1818 ships
Maritime incidents in October 1844